Rev. Marc H Lowrance III, (July 5, 1959), is a United Methodist minister who has previously worked as a former sports anchor and professional wrestling announcer, best known as one of the voices of World Class Championship Wrestling, a Dallas, Texas-based wrestling organization operated by Fritz Von Erich during the 1980s.

Lowrance's easy-going announcing style and a few memorable one-liners, as well as memorable interviews with other wrestlers, made him one of the most well-known wrestling announcers in the country.  A fan of broadcaster Harry Caray, Lowrance would also use his famous one-liners such as "holy cow".

Biography

Career in World Class Championship Wrestling
While a student at Texas Christian University in Fort Worth, Marc was the public address announcer for the Fort Worth Texans, a minor league hockey affiliate of the New York Islanders and the Colorado Rockies (NHL). Lowarance also served as public address announcer at Texas Christian football games at Ammon Carter Stadium.  He also was a broadcaster on the Texas State Radio Network in the late-1970s and early-1980s. When Boyd Pierce left the promotion in 1980, Steve Harms, a sports anchor at KXAS_TV (NBC) recommended Marc to Gary Hart and Jack Adkisson, aka Fritz Von Erich.  Marc was hired by Von Erich to be the new ring announcer at the Dallas Sportatorium, replacing longtime announcer Boyd Pierce, who had moved on to Bill Watts' Mid-South Wrestling promotion. Initially, Lowrance was to have been a fill-in for three weeks while a new replacement for Pierce was sought. Eventually, when the new replacement was nowhere to be found, Lowrance was hired permanently, and became a mainstay with pro wrestling for ten years.

When World Class began its syndicated broadcasts in 1982, Lowrance was one of its original TV announcers along with Steve Harms and Gene Goodson.

By 1983, he was ring announcer only in Dallas when legendary Dallas broadcaster Bill Mercer took over the syndicated broadcasts, then took over Mercer's spot in its local wrestling broadcast Championship Sports, which originated from Fort Worth and airing exclusively Saturday nights on KTVT Channel 11. As perhaps a foreshadowing of what his future career would be, Lowrance would end each broadcast by urging viewers to "Attend the church of your choice tomorrow."

During the height of World Class' glory days in 1985, Lowrance was credited for saving referee David Manning from serious injury and possible death when his head was hanged from the ropes after Gino Hernandez pushed Manning towards the ropes.  Manning was treated for a throat injury and eventually returned to officiate the following Friday in Dallas.

Return to the syndicated and ESPN World Class broadcasts
In 1987, Lowrance returned to the ESPN World Class broadcasts, thus giving his ring announcing chores to Ralph Pulley, whom filled in for Lowrance on many occasions at the Sportatorium and larger venues such as Reunion Arena. In late-1988, Marc was paired with former wrestler Frank Dusek on the ESPN World Class broadcasts, then a year later was paired with wrestler Terrance Garvin, and later with Percy Pringle.

Notable matches called by Lowrance
Some of the famous World Class matches Marc Lowrance announced include:
 Kerry Von Erich winning the NWA World title from Ric Flair on May 6, 1984.
 The 12-man, two-ring tag team match the following year at Texas Stadium
 Gino Hernandez blinding Chris Adams, January 27, 1986.
 The infamous Christmas Day Massacre; December 25, 1987.
 Eric Embry defeating P.Y. Chu-Hi (Phil Hickerson) to change World Class to the United States Wrestling Association (USWA). Lowrance did post-match voice-over commentary for ESPN, as he was at ringside during the bout alongside manager Percy Pringle.

Life in the ministry
In May 1990, Lowrance left pro wrestling to become a minister with a United Methodist church in suburban Fort Worth.  He returned to the Sportatorium as a ring announcer the following September, and has made several appearances at wrestling events over the years afterwards.  On the DVD Heroes of World Class, Lowrance credits his time as a wrestling announcer with getting him ready to serve as a minister far more than four years of seminary ever did.

Marc Lowrance was the senior pastor at St. John the Apostle United Methodist Church in Arlington, Texas upon his retirement on 01/01/2021.

He still appears on occasion at wrestling conventions throughout Texas and other parts of the country and conducts interviews about his time in World Class. Lowrance reunited with fellow WCCW broadcast partner Bill Mercer and WCCW manager Skandor Akbar at IHWE 1 Night Only Event on October 4, 2008 in Fort Worth, TX.

References

Professional wrestling announcers
1959 births
Living people
American United Methodist clergy
20th-century Methodists
20th-century Methodist ministers
21st-century Methodist ministers